Hestiochora tricolor is a moth of the family Zygaenidae. It is found in the southern half of Australia, including Tasmania.

The wingspan is about 20 mm. The adults are rather wasp like. They have black bodies with white bands, and a red collar around their heads. The wings are black but lose their scales readily to become partly transparent.

The larvae feed on Myrtaceae species, including Syncarpia glomulifera and Eucalyptus species.

External links
Australian Faunal Directory
Australian Insects

Procridinae
Moths described in 1854